Allium anceps, known as twinleaf onion and Kellogg's onion, is a species of wild onion native to the western United States. It is widespread in Nevada, extending into adjacent parts of California, Idaho, and Oregon. It grows in barren clay and rocky soils.

There are up to 5 bulbs, sometimes wrapped together in the brown or yellow-brown outer coat. It bears an umbel of 15 to 35 flowers with two spathes at the base. The six stamens are tipped with yellow anthers bearing yellow pollen. Once the seeds mature the scape dies and breaks off, usually along with the leaves.

The bulbs are edible and were a food source for the Northern Paiute, who roasted them and pressed them into cakes.

References

External links

anceps
Flora of California
Flora of Idaho
Flora of Nevada
Flora of Oregon
Flora of the Great Basin
Onions
Plants described in 1863
Taxa named by Albert Kellogg
Least concern flora of the United States